The Neilson River flows into the territory of the municipality of Saint-Raymond, in the Portneuf Regional County Municipality, in the administrative region of the Capitale-Nationale, in Quebec, in Canada.

The Neilson River is mainly served by the rang Saguenay road which runs on the east bank of the river.

The main economic activities in the sector are forestry and recreational tourism activities.

The surface of the North Arm (except the rapids zones) is generally frozen from the beginning of December to the end of March, but the safe circulation on the ice is generally made from the end of December to the beginning of March.

Geography 
Neilson River flows from north to south in the Roquemont Township, in Saint-Raymond in a forest environment, then turns west. It leaves the territory by redirecting again towards the south, to go to throw itself empting into the Bras du Nord in the row V of Roquemont Township, at the confluence of the Sainte-Anne Ouest River.

Upper course of the Neilson river (segment of )

  to the west, forming a curve towards the north, up to a bend in the river;
  to the south, collecting the discharge (coming from the northwest) from Lac Saint-Onge, collecting the discharge (coming from the northeast) from Étang Ponctué, then branching off towards the southwest, to the outlet (coming from the north) of three lakes (Nancy, Premier lac des Clavaires and Second lac des Clavaires);
  to the south, collecting the discharge (coming from the east) from Lac Josselin, collecting the discharge (coming from the west) from Lac du Cresson and the discharge (coming from north-west) from Étang aux Algues, to the outlet (coming from the east) of a group of lakes including Perronet, Richard and Pomone;
  westwards, up to a bend in the river;
  south, to the outlet (coming from the south) of Lake Bleury;
  towards the west by forming a hook towards the north, until the discharge of a set of lakes including Brocard, Faubert and Cargré;

Intermediate course of the Neilson river (segment of )

  towards the south becoming more and more steep, up to a bend of the river corresponding to the outlet of Lake Durouzeau;
  to the southwest, collecting the outlet (coming from the nod) from Lac D'Aleyrac, to the outlet (coming from the northwest) of a set of lakes including Grésin, Rosoy, Charlotte, Nikik, Perronne and de la Carie;
  southwards crossing Lake Hélène over its full length, to Leclerc stream (coming from the northeast);
  towards the south-east notably by crossing Lake Neilson over its full length , to its mouth;

Lower Neilson River (downstream from Neilson Lake) (segment of )

  southward, to a bend corresponding to the outlet (coming from the south) of Gagnon stream;
  first towards the west, then towards the south-west, in a deep valley, to the outlet (coming from the north) of Lake Picard;
  to the south in a well-boxed valley, forming a curve towards the west to go around a mountain whose summit reaches , up to its mouth.

Toponymy 
The name "Zec Batiscan-Neilson" originates from the Neilson river flowing in Neilson Township, from the north end of the territory of the ZEC. This river flows first south, then turns west. She leaves the territory by redirecting back to the south to go jump into the Sainte-Anne River.

At fifty kilometers northwest of Quebec, Neilson Township has an irregular shape. Crossed by the river Neilson, this particular township includes lakes Aaron and Picard. This township is located in the extension of the lordship Saint-Gabriel and fief Hubert.

Adopted around 1916, the name Neilson Township honors John Neilson (1776–1848). For his work in public life, he contributed greatly to the development of the region since the early nineteenth century. Originally from Scotland, he came to live with his brother Samuel, who acquired the Quebec Gazette. In 1793, John inherited the newspaper and printing. Upon reaching his majority in 1796, he became editor-owner of the weekly newspaper. In 1816, Neilson helped recruit European settlers, mostly Irish, and encouraged them to settle in neighboring lordships in a township area which later became Valcartier. John Neilson was elected several times member of Quebec County, Quebec. He completed his final term as MP from 1842 to 1844 in the Parliament of United Canada

The name "River Neilson" was recorded on December 5, 1968, at the bank of place names in Commission de toponymie du Québec (Geographical Names Board of Québec)

See also

See also 
 Saint-Raymond
 Portneuf Regional County Municipality
 Capitale-Nationale
 Neilson Township
 Bras du Nord
 Sainte-Anne
 Zec Batiscan-Neilson
 List of rivers of Quebec

References 

Rivers of Capitale-Nationale
Tributaries of the Saint Lawrence River